Bussey is a surname. Notable people with the surname include:

Andrew Bussey (born 1979), American Olympic sprint canoeist
Barney Bussey (born 1962), American football player
Ben Bussey, planetary scientist
Benjamin Bussey (1757–1842), merchant, farmer, horticulturalist and patriot from Boston, US
Bill Bussey (born 1964), co-host of the Rick and Bubba comedy radio show
Cyrus Bussey (1833–1915), American soldier and politician
Dave Bussey (born 1952), British radio DJ
Dexter Bussey (born 1952), American football player
George Bussey (born 1984), American football player
George Gibson Bussey (1829–89), English inventor
Lionel Bussey (1883–1969), British engineer and collector of women's shoes
Thomas H. Bussey (1857–bef. 1941), New York state senator
Walter Bussey (1904–82), English footballer
Young Bussey (1917–1945), American football player

See also
Bussy (surname)
De Bussy